The Ruwenzori, also spelled Rwenzori and Rwenjura, or Rwenzururu are a range of mountains in eastern equatorial Africa, located on the border between Uganda and the Democratic Republic of the Congo.  The highest peak of the Ruwenzori reaches , and the range's upper regions are permanently snow-capped and glaciated.  Rivers fed by mountain streams form one of the sources of the Nile. Because of this, European explorers linked the Ruwenzori with the legendary Mountains of the Moon, claimed by the Greek scholar Ptolemy as the source of the Nile.  Virunga National Park in eastern DR Congo and Rwenzori Mountains National Park in southwestern Uganda are located within the range.

Geology

The mountains formed about three million years ago in the late Pliocene epoch and are the result of an uplifted block of crystalline rocks including gneiss, amphibolite, granite and quartzite.

The Rwenzori mountains are the highest non-volcanic, non-orogenic mountains in the world.

This uplift divided the paleolake Obweruka and created three of the present-day African Great Lakes: Lake Albert, Lake Edward, and Lake George.

It consists of six massifs separated by deep gorges: Mount Stanley, Mount Speke, Mount Baker, Mount Emin, Mount Gessi and Mount Luigi di Savoia. Mount Stanley has several subsidiary summits, with Margherita Peak being the highest point.

Human history 

The mountains are occasionally identified with the legendary "Mountains of the Moon", described in antiquity as the source of the Nile River.  Modern European explorers observed the range beginning in the late nineteenth century, with Samuel Baker reporting what he called the "Blue Mountains" looming in the distance in 1864, and Henry M. Stanley visiting the range in 1875 and 1888, when he recorded the name as "Ruwenzori".

In 1906, the Duke of Abruzzi mounted an expedition to the Ruwenzori, the account of which was subsequently published by Filippo De Filippi.  The expedition scaled the highest peaks of the range, several of which were named by the duke, while Mount Luigi di Savoia was named in his honour.  Accompanying the duke was photographer Vittorio Sella, who had previously visited the mountains.  His photographs of the glaciers and moraines of the Ruwenzori demonstrated that the glaciers were already in retreat. Sella's photographic work is conserved at the Museo Nazionale della Montagna in Turin and at the Istituto di Fotografia Alpina Vittorio Sella in Biella, both in Italy. The Makerere University, Uganda, also has a selection of his images.

The first traverse of the six massifs of the Ruwenzori was done in 1975, starting on 27 January and ending on 13 February. The traverse was done by Polish climbers Janusz Chalecki, Stanisław Cholewa and Leszek Czarnecki, with Mirosław Kuraś accompanying them on the last half of the traverse.

Since Uganda's independence from the British Empire, the Rwenzori Mountains have repeatedly become sanctuaries to rebel groups. The secessionist Rwenzururu movement fought an insurgency in the mountains in the 1960s. In course of the Ugandan Bush War, the Rwenzururu movement reemerged and continued its struggle until signing a peace deal with Ugandan President Milton Obote's government. In the Bush War's later stages, the National Resistance Army (NRA) rebel force operated in the mountains. After the NRA seized power in Uganda in 1986, another civil war broke out. This time, the Rwenzori Mountains hosted the bases of the National Army for the Liberation of Uganda (NALU) and the "Partie de Liberation Congolaise" (PLC), an anti-Mobutu rebel group. In the early 1990s, a Congolese rebel group known as the National Council of Resistance for Democracy (Conseil National de Résistance pour la Démocratie, CNRD) led by André Kisase Ngandu began to wage an insurgency against Mobutu from the Rwenzori Mountains.

Militias aligned with the old Rwenzururu movement's ideology occupied the Rwenzori Mountains from 1997 to June 2001. In 2020, after being defeated across the border by the Armed Forces of the Democratic Republic of the Congo, some elements of the Allied Democratic Forces moved into the Rwenzori Mountains.

Natural history

Flora

The Ruwenzori are known for their vegetation, ranging from tropical rainforest through alpine meadows to snow. Most of the range is now a World Heritage Site and is covered jointly by Rwenzori Mountains National Park in southwestern Uganda and the Virunga National Park in the eastern Congo.

There is no water shortage in the Ruwenzori; yet, several members of the afro-alpine family resemble species that normally thrive in desert climates. The reason lies in their similar water economy. Water is not always readily available to the afroalpine plants when they need it. In addition, nightly frosts affect the sap transport in the plants and the intake of water by its roots. As the day begins, the air temperature and radiation level rise rapidly, putting strenuous demands on the exposed parts of the plants as they try to meet the transpiration demands of the leaves and maintain a proper water balance. To counter the effects of freezing, the afro-alpine plants have developed the insulation systems that give them such a striking appearance. These adaptations become more prominent as the elevation increases.

There are five overlapping vegetation zones in the Ruwenzori: the evergreen forest zone (up to ); the bamboo zone; the heather zone; the alpine zone; and, the nival zone. At higher elevations, some plants reach an unusually large size, such as lobelia and groundsels. The vegetation in the Ruwenzori is unique to equatorial alpine Africa.

Sources:

Glacial recession 

An ongoing concern is the impact of climate change on the Ruwenzori's glaciers. Recent scientific studies, such as those by Richard Taylor of University College London, have attributed this retreat to global climate change and have investigated the impact of this change on the mountain's vegetation and biodiversity. In 2012 Klaus Thymann lead an expedition with the environmental charity Project Pressure creating comparative photographs to visually document the glacier recession, the findings were published in global media including BBC One Planet and The Guardian. 
The alteration can be seen in comparative images. As the temperature rises and the glaciers recede, vegetation slowly creeps up the mountain.

See also
1966 Toro earthquake

Notes

References
 
 Glaciers of the Middle East and Africa, Williams, Richard S., Jr. (editor) In: U. S. Geological Survey Professional Paper, 1991, pp.G1-G70
 Guide to the Ruwenzori, Osmaston,H.A., Pasteur,D. 1972, Mountain Club of Uganda. 200 p.
 Recession of Equatorial Glaciers. A Photo Documentation, Hastenrath, S., 2008, Sundog Publishing, Madison, WI, 144 pp.
 Tropical Glaciers, Kaser, G., Osmaston, H.A. 2002, Cambridge University Press, UK. 207 p.
 Ruwenzori, De Filippi, F. 1909. Constable, London. 408 p.
 Greenpeace article "The Death of the Ice Giants"
 BBC Article "Fabled ice field set to vanish"
 Dr Taylor's Homepage, with information about the impact of climate change on Ruwenzori.
 Kaser et al. 2006, in International Book of Climatology 24: 329–339 (2004)

External links

 
 UWM.edu: 1937 aerial photographs of Rwenzori Mountains – University of Wisconsin-Milwaukee Libraries Digital Collections.
 

 
Albertine Rift montane forests
Mountain ranges of Uganda
Mountain ranges of the Democratic Republic of the Congo
Great Rift Valley
Kasese District
North Kivu